Oleksandr Nartov (born 21 May 1988) is a Ukrainian high jumper.

He won the silver medal at the 2003 World Youth Championships and the 2005 World Youth Championships, the gold medal at the 2007 European Junior Championships, the bronze medal at the 2007 Summer Universiade and the silver medal at the 2009 European U23 Championships. He competed at the 2008 Olympic Games and the 2009 European Indoor Championships without reaching the final.

His personal best jump is 2.31 metres, achieved in February 2012 in Berdychiv.

Competition record

References

1988 births
Living people
Ukrainian male high jumpers
Athletes (track and field) at the 2008 Summer Olympics
Olympic athletes of Ukraine
Universiade medalists in athletics (track and field)
Universiade bronze medalists for Ukraine
Medalists at the 2007 Summer Universiade
Kharkiv State College of Physical Culture 1 alumni